Borough of Lambeth  may refer to:

London Borough of Lambeth, England (1965—present)
Metropolitan Borough of Lambeth (1900—1965)